The 1998 Torneo Grandes de Centroamérica was the 16th edition of the UNCAF Club Tournament and the third and last under this name. Costa Rican Deportivo Saprissa obtained its 4th regional title.

Teams

Qualifying

Honduras

Play-off

Group phase

Group A

 As of 17 December 1997

 Águila 2–3 Municipal on penalty shootouts.

Group B

 As of 11 December 1997

 Saprissa 4–3 Aurora on penalty shootouts.
 Motagua 3–4 Saprissa on penalty shootouts.
 Saprissa 3–5 Real España on penalty shootouts.
 Aurora 4–2 Motagua on penalty shootouts.
 Saprissa 3–5 Real España on penalty shootouts.
 Real España 5–4 Motagua on penalty shootouts.
 Aurora 5–3 Real España on penalty shootouts.
 Motagua's remaining matches were not played.

Final round

Semifinals

 Municipal won 3–1 on aggregate score.

 The last suggested dates by Saprissa for the semifinals (19 and 23 August) were not accepted by Olimpia due to league obligations. UNCAF decided to award Saprissa a walkover.

Final

 Saprissa won 3–2 on aggregate score.

1998
1
1997–98 in Honduran football
1997–98 in Salvadoran football
1997–98 in Guatemalan football
1997–98 in Costa Rican football
1998–99 in Honduran football
1998–99 in Salvadoran football
1998–99 in Guatemalan football
1998–99 in Costa Rican football